Assar Åkerman (28 October 1860 – 1936) was a Swedish jurist and Social Democratic politician.

He served as Minister for Justice in 1920, and from 1921 to 1923.

References 

1860 births
1936 deaths
Swedish Social Democratic Party politicians
Swedish Ministers for Justice